James Henry Coyne,  (October 3, 1849 – January 5, 1942) was a Canadian lawyer and historian.

Born in St. Thomas, Canada West (now Ontario), the second son of William Coyne and Christina Patterson, Coyne graduated from University College, Toronto in 1870. He studied law in St. Thomas and was called to the Ontario Bar in 1874. He practiced law in St. Thomas.

During the Fenian raids of 1866, Coyne joined the St. Thomas Rifles (or 1st Volunteer Militia Rifle Company at St. Thomas which formed the 25th Elgin Battalion of Infantry and now as 31 Combat Engineer Regiment (The Elgin's)) and served in three campaigns in London, Port Stanley, and Sarnia. He acted as quartermaster-sergeant to the Provisional battalion of volunteers in Thorold. In 1877, he joined the University company of the Queen's Own Rifles, where he remained a member until his graduation in 1870.

From 1898 to 1902, he was President of the Ontario Historical Society and was a member of the Historic Sites and Monuments Board of Canada from 1919 to 1930.

In 1906 he was made a Fellow of the Royal Society of Canada and served as its president from 1926 to 1927.

He married Matilda Bowes in 1877 and had at least four children. His son, James Bowes Coyne, was a lawyer and judge in Manitoba. James Bowes Coyne's son, James Elliott Coyne, was the second Governor of the Bank of Canada. Op-ed writer Andrew Coyne is a great-grandson.

Works
 
 
 

Source:

References

External links
 
 
 
 The Country of the Neutrals, James H. Coyne

1849 births
1942 deaths
19th-century Canadian historians
Canadian male non-fiction writers
Fellows of the Royal Society of Canada
Lawyers in Ontario
Persons of National Historic Significance (Canada)
People from St. Thomas, Ontario
People of the Fenian raids
University of Toronto alumni
James Henry
20th-century Canadian historians